Bothwell was a federal and provincial electoral district in the Canadian province of Ontario, which was represented in the House of Commons of Canada from 1867 to 1904 and in the Legislative Assembly of Ontario from 1867 to 1875. It is sometimes also considered one of Ontario's historic counties, as it was listed in some post-Confederation census records as a county of residence.

Federal district
At its creation in 1867, Bothwell consisted of the Kent County townships of Bothwell, Camden, Dresden, Howard, Orford, Ridgetown, Thamesville and Zone, and the Lambton County townships of Dawn, Euphemia and Sombra. In 1882, the Townships of Euphemia, Orford and Howard were excluded from the riding, and the township of Chatham, the villages of Wallaceburg, Dresden and Thamesville, and the town of Bothwell were added to the riding.

The electoral district was abolished in 1903 when it was redistributed between Kent East, Kent West, Simcoe East and Simcoe South ridings.

Provincial district
The provincial district was divided between Kent West and Kent East in 1875.

Members of Parliament

This riding elected the following members of the House of Commons of Canada:

David Mills, Liberal - 1867-1882
John Joseph Hawkins, Conservative - 1882-1884 (election voided on appeal)
David Mills, Liberal - 1884-1896
James Clancy, Conservative - 1896-1903

Members of the Legislative Assembly
The riding elected the following member to the Legislative Assembly of Ontario:
Archibald McKellar, Ontario Liberal Party - 1867-1875

Election results

|}

|}

|}

Mr. David Mills was appointed Minister of the Interior and Superintendent General of Indian Affairs, 24 October 1876:

|}

|}

|}

Election declared void Mr. J.J. Hawkins was declared not duly elected and was unseated by judgement of Supreme Court. The seat was awarded to his opponent, 25 February 1884:

|}

|}

|}

|}

|}

External links
Riding history from the Library of Parliament

Former counties in Ontario
Former federal electoral districts of Ontario
Former provincial electoral districts of Ontario